Belin may refer to:

People 
Belinus, called "the Great", a legendary 4th-century BC king of the Britons
Albert Belin, French bishop and writer
Augusto Belin, Argentinian writer and diplomat
Bruno Belin, Croatian footballer
Chuck Belin, American footballer
David W. Belin, American businessman
Édouard Belin, Swiss photographer
Fred de Belin, Australian rugby footballer
Jack de Belin, Australian rugby footballer
Jean-Baptiste Belin, French painter
René Belin (1898–1977), French trade unionist and politician
Rudolf Belin, Croatian footballer
Valérie Belin, French photographer

Places 
Belín, Rimavská Sobota District, village and municipality in the Banská Bystrica Region, Slovakia
Belin-Béliet, a commune in the Gironde department, France
Belin, Covasna, a commune in Covasna County, Romania
Belin, Myanmar, a town in Mon State, Burma
Belin, Poland, a village in the administrative district of Gmina Nowe Miasto, Poland
Belin (river), a river in Tuva, Russia
Laigné-en-Belin, a commune in the Sarthe department, France
Moncé-en-Belin, a commune in the Sarthe department, France
Saint-Biez-en-Belin, a commune in the Sarthe department, France
Saint-Gervais-en-Belin, a commune in the Sarthe department, France
Saint-Ouen-en-Belin,  a commune in the Sarthe department, France

Other
Belenus, a Celtic sun-god like Apollo
 Éditions Belin, French book publisher since 1777

See also
Beilin (disambiguation)
Bilen (disambiguation)